Gerakari may refer to several places in Greece:

Gerakari, Ioannina, a village in Ioannina (regional unit)
Gerakari, Kilkis, a village in Kilkis (regional unit)
Gerakari, Larissa, a village
Gerakari, Rethymno, a village
Gerakari, Trikala, a village in Trikala (regional unit)
Ano Gerakari, a village on the island Zakynthos
Kato Gerakari, a village on the island Zakynthos
Meso Gerakari, a village on the island Zakynthos